Harald Sødal (born 20 May 1938) is a Norwegian politician for the Christian Democratic Party.

He became a deputy councilman in Kristiansand city council in 1967, and advanced to a regular representative in 1971. In 2007 he started his tenth period in the city council. He was deputy mayor for four terms. 

He is a member of the board of Arkivet and Vest-Agder-museet. He belongs to the Evangelical Lutheran Free Church of Norway, but is also a member of the Church of Norway. He is also an avid amateur musician and choir leader.

References

1938 births
Living people
Christian Democratic Party (Norway) politicians
Politicians from Kristiansand
Norwegian Lutherans